The Belle Fourche Formation or Belle Fourche Shale is a fossiliferous early Late-Cretaceous geologic formation classification in Wyoming. Named for outcrops in Belle Fourche River, Wyoming, this unit name is also used in Montana, North Dakota, and South Dakota.

The unit records the gradual opening and expansion of the Greenhorn Cycle of the Western Interior Seaway, and as such is lithologically identical to the Graneros Shale Formation (that is, it is the same formation under a different name).

See also

 List of fossiliferous stratigraphic units in Montana
 Paleontology in Montana
 Paleontology in North Dakota
 Paleontology in South Dakota
 Paleontology in Wyoming

References

 

Cretaceous Montana
Cretaceous geology of North Dakota
Cretaceous geology of South Dakota
Cretaceous geology of Wyoming